Online Policy Group v. Diebold, Inc., 337 F. Supp. 2d 1195 (N.D. Cal. 2004), was a lawsuit involving an archive of Diebold's (now Premier Election Solutions) internal company e-mails and Diebold's contested copyright claims over them. The Electronic Frontier Foundation and the Stanford Cyberlaw Clinic provided pro bono legal support for the non-profit ISP and the Swarthmore College students, respectively.

United States District Judge Jeremy Fogel ruled that the plaintiffs' publishing of the e-mails was clearly a fair use essentially "because there was no commercial harm and no diminishment of value of the works" in their republication. Additionally Diebold was found to have misrepresented its copyright controls over the work, putting them in violation of section 512(f) of the Digital Millennium Copyright Act (DMCA) and leaving them liable for court costs and damages. This was the first time 512(f) had been enforced in court, and set a precedent.

Background 
Sometime in the spring of 2003 an unknown hacker broke into Diebold computers and obtained a large portion of their email archives, which was posted to various web sites. In an effort to quash the dissemination of information about security flaws in its voting machines, Diebold had sent dozens of DMCA takedown notices to various ISPs, all of which complied, except for OPG. Diebold sent takedown notices not only to sites actually storing the information, but also to those that merely linked to it. More specifically, Diebold sent DMCA notices to Swarthmore College, the ISP where the two students Nelson Pavlosky and Luke Smith had posted the 15,000 emails on their Swarthmore Coalition for the Digital Commons web page. Diebold also sent notices to the Online Policy Group, the ISP for an IndyMedia site linking to Pavlosky & Smith's web page, and also to Hurricane Electric, OPG's upstream provider. After Swarthmore complied and removed the material, Pavlosky, Smith and the OPG sued Diebold, "asserting the company's accusation of infringement "was based on knowing material misrepresentation," an actionable claim under a provision of the DMCA (17 U.S.C. 512(f)) and, furthermore, "interfered with [the] contractual relations" between the students and their Internet service providers". Although Diebold withdrew their DMCA letters after a media backlash, the plaintiffs decided to pursue Diebold in court; before the trial, EFF's legal director Cindy Cohn said that "We think it's important that the court make it clear that if you misuse the powers the DMCA has granted copyright holders, there are going to be serious consequences."<ref>Voting machine showdown. A leading maker of computer election equipment defends itself in court against charges that it overreached itself in trying to stifle critics. By Farhad Manjoo, Salon, Feb 10, 2004</ref>

The OPG is a free, donation-based web host run by Roger Klorese, David Weekly, and Will Doherty; it was hosting the website for SF Bay Area Indymedia (Indybay) when a story linking to the Diebold e-mail archive was posted to Indybay. The link was not a direct link to the e-mail archive: upon reaching the linked page, the reader had to click another link to download the memos themselves. Diebold sent legal threats to OPG, asserting that the memos were copyrighted and that Indybay was committing tertiary infringement by linking to a link to the Diebold memos. When Indymedia and OPG refused to act, Diebold sent legal threats to OPG's upstream ISP, Hurricane Electric (HE), effectively accusing HE of quaternary copyright infringement.

 Verdict 
Judge Fogel noted that Diebold's filing contained contradictory elements, and on the matter of fair use determined that:

He then concluded that "Diebold violated section 512(f)" of the DMCA:

Consequently, Diebold was ordered to pay $125,000 in damages.

The failure to consider fair use before sending a DMCA notice was also found to compromise its good faith nature in Lenz v. Universal Music Corp. (2008). OPG v. Diebold is also used as a textbook illustration of four-factor analysis (of fair use) alongside Sony Corp. of America v. Universal City Studios, Inc. and MGM v. Grokster''.

References

External links
 
 EFF's official page with all of the court documents
 Online Policy Group official website

2004 in United States case law
Swarthmore College
United States computer case law
United States copyright case law
United States District Court for the Northern District of California cases
Electronic Frontier Foundation litigation
Digital Millennium Copyright Act case law
Diebold